Ali Khan Shaqaqi was the first khan of the Sarab Khanate from 1747 to 1786.

References

People from Sarab, East Azerbaijan
Sarab Khanate